Roio  is a frazione of L'Aquila in the Abruzzo, region of Italy.

Frazioni of L'Aquila